The Howard School (THS) is located in Atlanta, Georgia, United States. It was founded by Marian Howard in 1950 to give students alternative approaches to learning. Students with language-based learning disabilities and learning differences from grades K-12 may attend the school.

History
The Howard School was established in 1950. In 2004, the school raised $18,150,000, and a major overhaul of the campus was completed along with one classroom building, a gymnasium and a multi-purpose facility. In January 2007 the ribbon-cutting ceremony occurred and students moved in. Planning began almost immediately for future growth, specifically for the middle school and the enlargement of the lower school and elementary school.

Facilities

The school currently has one classroom building, a gymnasium and a multi-purpose facility. Over the past three years, the Howard School has been working on renovating and constructing new buildings to further enhance the students' education. In January 2007, THS cut the ribbon on a new middle school and high school. This provides one classroom building, a gymnasiumm with two basketball courts, and a multi-purpose facility that houses a black box theater, music room and cafeteria.

Middle school program
The Howard School's middle school follows the Fulton County curriculum. The small class size of 10 students or fewer allows the teacher personal hands-on time, making class time very conducive to learning. As a result, there is little need for the traditional hours of homework that many students have experienced in the past. Since homework should ideally be the independent practice of newly acquired educational skills, drill and kill is definitely not part of the curriculum.

In the afternoon, students choose two elective classes on a Monday/Wednesday, Tuesday/Thursday time frame. The school offers a wide variety of electives and exploratories, giving students the opportunity to pursue personal interests and explore new opportunities. These courses include Co-op work experiences, Promotional Art, Drama, Culinary Arts, Yearbook, Forensics, Computer Exploration, Carpentry, Multicultural Art, Photography, Ethics/Debate, Drivers Education, Aviation/Space, Cheerleading, Mountain Biking, Jewelry-Making, Fencing, Bowling, Basketball, Baseball, Soccer, Cross Country, Swimming, Personal Fitness, and Volleyball.

High school program
The Howard School's high school curriculum follows the State of Georgia's academic graduation requirements. A total of 22 Carnegie Units is required for graduating. Besides the four core academic subjects, mathematics, English, social studies and science, both Spanish and American Sign Language are offered as foreign languages. THS emphasizes organization, time management, study skills, and preparation for a successful future.

Post-secondary plan
Based on the individual needs of the students, the academic curriculum prepares students for post-secondary options. These may include college preparatory, technical, or vocational education, or apprenticeship training for a specialized career. An integral component of this preparation, as well as a graduation requirement, is the completion of an accepted post-secondary plan.

The awarding of the diploma is contingent upon finalization of this plan by any of the following: 
 Letter of acceptance, on file, with the Academic Counselor to a two or four-year college, university, technical college, vocational program, training or apprenticeship program by a company or business 
 Letter of induction to any branch of the military, on file with the Academic Counselor indicating the date of induction

References

External links
 

Schools in Atlanta